Sergei Kiselyov (born 5 February 1961) is a Russian swimmer. He competed in the men's 100 metre butterfly at the 1980 Summer Olympics.

References

1961 births
Living people
Russian male swimmers
Olympic swimmers of the Soviet Union
Swimmers at the 1980 Summer Olympics
Sportspeople from Smolensk
Universiade medalists in swimming
Universiade bronze medalists for the Soviet Union
Medalists at the 1979 Summer Universiade
Medalists at the 1981 Summer Universiade
Soviet male swimmers